Tomopleura fuscocincta is a species of sea snail, a marine gastropod mollusk in the family Borsoniidae.

Description
The length of the shell attains 11 mm.

Distribution
This marine species occurs in the Atlantic Ocean off Angola.

References

  Gofas S. & Rolán E. (2009) A systematic review of "Asthenotoma spiralis (Smith, 1872)" in West Africa, with description of two new species (Mollusca, Gastropoda, Conoidea). Zoosystema 31: 5–16

External links
 

Endemic fauna of Angola
fuscocincta
Gastropods described in 2009